To Get Unstuck In Time is a 2004 Hong Kong mystery/science-fiction television drama produced by Television Broadcasts Limited (TVB) under executive producer Lam Chi-wah.

Plot
The drama stars Benz Hui and Roger Kwok as father and son, who work together across time to solve murders and crimes that occurred in 1984 and present time (2004). The drama is loosely inspired by the 2000 film Frequency.

Cast and characters
Roger Kwok as "Morning Sir" Ho Tin-kwong (何天光) — the senior inspector of the Criminal Investigation Department. He communicates with his deceased father through an old phone that he discovered in his house. Together, they solve crimes that occur both during his father's time and present time.
Benz Hui as Ho Tai-hor (何大河) — Morning Sir's father. He worked as a police officer twenty years ago.
Flora Chan as Ko Shan (高珊) — Morning Sir's love interest. She writes detective fiction novels and is confined in a wheel chair for the rest of her life.
Kiki Sheung as Cheung Yuet-ping (張月萍) — known as "Sister Mon", she is Morning Sir's mother and Hor's wife. She works as a forensic science technician.
Patrick Tang as Hugo Yuen Chi-ko (阮志高) — also nicknamed "Ah Hiu", he is an officer under Morning Sir's CID team.
Cherie Kong as Lee Sze-ching (李詩菁) — nicknamed "Si Hing" (lit. "Senior brother"), she is Shan's younger cousin. She is an officer under Morning Sir's CID team.
Bill Chan as Herman / Ho Ching-nam (賀正南) — Shan's boss.
Ram Chiang as Ng Wai-fung (伍偉峰) — nicknamed "Wai Fung" (lit. "powerful" or "awesome"), he is an officer under Morning Sir's CID team. He also worked with Morning Sir's father twenty years ago.
Jerry Ku as Lau Chung (劉忠) — Hor's sidekick.
Henry Lee as Ko King-chueng (高景昌) — Shan's father who is a barrister.
Law Koon-lan as Leung Miu-lan (梁妙蘭) — Shan's mother who is a piano teacher.
Matt Yeung as Ko Ming (高明) — Shan's younger brother.
Siu Leung as Superintendent Chung Kar-ting (鍾家鼎) — Morning Sir's superior.

References

External links
TVB.com To Get Unstuck In Time - Official Website 

TVB dramas
Hong Kong science fiction television series
Hong Kong crime television series
Hong Kong time travel television series
Hong Kong police procedural television series
Serial drama television series
2004 Hong Kong television series debuts
2004 Hong Kong television series endings
2000s science fiction television series
Television series set in 1984
Television series set in 2004